The Japan men's national under-23 3x3 team is the national basketball team of Japan and is governed by the Japan Basketball Association.

It represents the country in international under-23 (under age 23) men's basketball competitions.

3x3 Under-23 World Cup

See also
Japan men's national 3x3 team
Japan men's national basketball team
Japan men's national under-17 basketball team
Japan men's national under-19 basketball team

References

National youth 3x3 basketball teams
3x3